The Tanzania Air Force Command is the aerial service branch of the Tanzania People's Defence Force (TPDF). The current commander of the Tanzania Air Force Command is Major General SB MANI
, who replaced major general Ingram upon the latter's retirement in 2021
.

History 
Tanzania established its air force as the "Air Wing" (Kiswahili: Usafirashaji wa Anga) of the Tanzania People's Defence Force's (TPDF) Air Defence Command in 1965. An autonomous branch, its purposes were to support the TPDF ground forces and ensure air links between the government and distant areas of the country.

The Tanzania Air Defence Command defeated the nominally stronger Uganda Army Air Force during the air campaign of the Uganda–Tanzania War (1978–79).

A few of the Tanzanian air wing's transport remain serviceable. However, its Shenyang F-5s, and Chengdu F-7s are reported to fly only on rare occasions because of airworthiness problems. Tanzania's long coastline means that transports are also used for patrol flights.

In 1980, an order for 10 F-7Bs and two TF-7s was issued to China, and in 1997 also two F-7Ns were purchased from Iran, together with four ex-Iraqi Air Force transports of an unknown type. Today, no Russian-supplied MiG-21s remain in service with the TPDF/AW, and only three or four F-7s remain operational. The TPDF/AW MiG-21MFs are now confirmed to have carried serials - in black or green - underneath the cockpit, but no details about these are known.

On 14 November 2013, Helmoed-Römer Heitman reported for Jane's Defence Weekly that a 'usually reliable source' had informed Jane's that the TPDF had replaced its 12 old CAC J-7 fighters with 14 new J-7s, twelve single-seat and two dual-seat. Deliveries were completed in 2011. Heitman also reported that the aircraft were fully operational at Dar es Salaam and Mwanza air bases.

Recent estimates (2014) suggest that Tanzania's air force command operates 32 aircraft in three different types. It is believed they are operating 14 fighters, 11 fixed-wing attack aircraft and 7 transport aircraft. On October 1, 2015, a K-8 trainer jet of Tanzania Air Force Command crashed into the sea killing both pilots.

Aircraft

Bases
 Ukonga Air Base, Dar es Salaam
 Mwanza Air Base, Mwanza
 Ngerengere Air Force Base, Morogoro

Commanding officer

References

Works cited

External links
 Shenyang J-6
 Images of Operation Maliza Matata September 2014

Military of Tanzania
Air forces by country
Military aviation in Africa
Air force